Haymarket bus station is a bus station located in the Haymarket area of Newcastle upon Tyne. It is situated next to the Haymarket Metro station, by the northern end of Northumberland Street and almost adjacent to Newcastle University.

History
The original bus station opened in 1930 and was rebuilt in 1971. It was completely rebuilt again, on a slightly different site, in 1996. This second rebuild was due to the expansion of the nearby Marks & Spencer shop, necessitating the demolition of a number of properties. The opportunity was taken to enlarge the bus station from 9 to 13 stands.

The station has 13 bus stands, lettered L to Y, with an additional alighting point located outside the main bus station building. The bus stands in nearby Eldon Square bus station are lettered A–K. A Nexus enquiry office and an Arriva travel shop are based within the bus station.

Haymarket bus station is mainly served by Arriva North East, with other routes operated by Go North East and independent operators. Services mainly operate to the north and east of the city, as well as North Tyneside and east Northumberland.

Buses from the nearby Eldon Square bus station serve destinations in the west of the city, as well as Gateshead, County Durham, Teesside and the Tyne Valley. Most long-distance coaches serve the separate Newcastle coach station.

Services and stands
, the stand allocation is:

Accidents and incidents
 A design fault in the glass roof caused panels to flex and dislodge from the frame in hot weather. A safety net was erected below the entire roof in July 2006, after a panel fell from the roof and injured a pedestrian. Since then the bus station has been redesigned, with the overhead glass panelling being replaced with a more solid roof structure.

References

External links

Map of stands and services for Eldon Square and Haymarket bus stations

Bus stations in Tyne and Wear
Rebuilt buildings and structures in the United Kingdom
Transport in Newcastle upon Tyne
Transport infrastructure completed in 1930
Transport infrastructure completed in 1971
Transport infrastructure completed in 1996
Tyne and Wear Passenger Transport Executive
1930 establishments in England